Brian Cuthbert (born 1975) is an Irish former Gaelic footballer.

Born in Bishopstown, Cork, Cuthbert first arrived on the inter-county scene at the age of seventeen when he first linked up with the Cork minor team, before later lining out with the under-21 side. Although he never played in the senior grade, Cuthbert won an All-Ireland medal as captain of the minor team in 1993.

At club level Cuthbert is a two-time championship medallist in the intermediate grade with Bishopstown as a hurler.

In retirement from playing Cuthbert became involved in team management and coaching. He began his career with various Cork development squads and the Cork Institute of Technology freshers team, before two years as manager of the Cork minor football team. He served as a senior selector under Conor Counihan while he also is heavily involved in coaching with the Bishopstown club side.

On 15 October 2013 Cuthbert was appointed manager of the Cork Senior Football Team on a two-year term. He resigned from the position on 28 July 2015.

Cuthbert is principal of Scoil an Spioraid Naoimh, a primary school in Bishopstown.

Honours

Player
Bishopstown
Cork Intermediate Hurling Championship (2): 1992, 2006

Cork
All-Ireland Minor Football Championship (1): 1993 (c)

Manager
Cork
McGrath Cup (1): 2014
Munster Minor Football Championship (1): 2010

References

1975 births
Living people
Bishopstown Gaelic footballers
Bishopstown hurlers
Cork inter-county Gaelic footballers
Cork inter-county hurlers
Dual players
Gaelic football managers
Gaelic football selectors
Heads of schools in Ireland